Larry Cowart (August 10, 1936 – July 2, 2004) was a Canadian football player who played for the Toronto Argonauts. He played college football at Baylor University.

References

2004 deaths
1936 births
Players of American football from Texas
Canadian football offensive linemen
Baylor Bears football players
Toronto Argonauts players
People from Cameron County, Texas